Kojiki is an album by the new age artist Kitarō, which was nominated for a Grammy award in 1990.

This album features the string section from the Skywalker Symphony, along with Kitaro's signature keyboard and flute sounds.  It was released in 1990.

The flute music and prelude in the song "Duniya Haseenon ka mela" from the Bollywood movie Gupt (released in 1997) has been partially influenced from the song Matsuri (among other songs by Kitaro), by the composer Viju Shah.

Track listing

Charts

References

External links
Kitaro Official site (English)
Kitaro Official site (Japanese)
Kitaro TV - Kitaro's official YouTube page
Kitaro Facebook

Kitarō albums
1990 albums
Geffen Records albums